Best Days is the debut studio album by American songwriter-singer Matt White. The album follows up his 2006 debut EP Bleecker Street Stories. The album was released on September 18, 2007, in the United States and achieved widespread success through social networks such as MySpace. The song, "Best Days" was used in the soundtracks to Shrek The Third (as Shrek and Fiona's song) and Hotel for Dogs.

Track listing
"Play"
"Best Days"
"I'll Be There"
"Moment of Weakness"
"Love"
"New York Girls"
"Miracles"
"Wait for Love"
"Anyone Else"
"Just What I'm Looking For"
"Paradise"

Charts

References

External links 
Matt White's official website
Matt White at CDuniverse

2006 albums
Pop albums by American artists